|
High school Campolindo High Moraga California.  
Total_Cup_Races = 2|
Years_In_Cup    = 1|
First_Cup_Race  = 1985 Budweiser 400 (Riverside)|
Last_Cup_Race   = 1985 Winston Western 500 (Riverside)|
Cup_Wins        = 0|
Cup_Top_Tens    = 0|
Cup_Poles       = 0|
}}

Blair Aiken (born September 2, 1956) is an American former stock car racing driver. He made two NASCAR Winston Cup Series starts in 1985. He also was a factor on the Winston West tour for a number of years.

Winston West

Aiken had a solid first season in this lower level NASCAR division: 1985. That year, Aiken had a best finish of 4th and used that to move to 5th in the season points. After a start in 1986, Aiken did not compete in the series until 1997, when he only made one start. Aiken's last year was in 1998, when he finished 16th in points with 3 top-fives and 13 top-tens. That included a career best 3rd at Mesa Marin.

Winston Cup

Aiken debuted at Riverside, starting the race in 36th. With an engine failing, Aiken would fall to 38th in the event. Later in 1985, Aiken would return to Riverside, starting in the 34th place. This time, Aiken was able to finish the race and do so in 29th.

Post-racing career
After retiring from racing, Aiken became the manager and promoter at Ukiah Speedway in California.

Motorsports career results

NASCAR
(key) (Bold – Pole position awarded by qualifying time. Italics – Pole position earned by points standings or practice time. * – Most laps led.)

Winston Cup Series

References

External links

Blair Aiken bio at racingwest.com

Living people
1956 births
People from Lakeport, California
Racing drivers from California
NASCAR drivers